The 1981 Midwestern City Conference men's basketball tournament (now known as the Horizon League men's basketball tournament) was held March 3–5 at campus sites (quarterfinals), Frederickson Fieldhouse in Oklahoma City, Oklahoma (semifinals), and Riverfront Coliseum in Cincinnati, Ohio (finals).

Oklahoma City defeated  in the championship game, 82–76, to win their first MCC/Horizon League men's basketball tournament.

The Chiefs, however, did not receive a bid to the 1981 NCAA tournament.

Format
All seven conference members participated in the tournament and were seeded based on regular season conference records. The top seed (Xavier) was given a bye into the semifinal round while the remaining six teams were placed into the initial quarterfinal round.

Bracket

References

Horizon League men's basketball tournament
Tournament
Midwestern City Conference men's basketball tournament
Midwestern City Conference men's basketball tournament